The royal fifth (Spanish and ) is an old royal tax that reserves to the monarch 20% of all precious metals and other commodities (including slaves) acquired by his subjects as war loot, found as treasure or extracted by mining.  The 'royal fifth' was instituted in medieval Muslim states, Christian Iberian kingdoms and their overseas colonial empires during the age of exploration. 

The 'royal fifth' has a dual origin.  In Christian kingdoms, it partly comes from the medieval legal conception of seigneural or regalian rights over the natural patrimony, which assigned to the monarch or feudal overlord original property rights over all unclaimed, undiscovered and undeveloped natural resources (e.g. precious metals in the subsoil, salt in the rock, virgin forests, fish in the sea, etc.) within his jurisdiction. Consequently, private individuals who extracted these natural resources owed compensation to their original 'owner', the monarch.

The 20% tax rate on war booty stems from the practice of khums in Islamic states. It was institutionalized from the start of the Islamic conquest, with the rate set down in Qur'an 8:41:

In practice, the share of the fifth reserved to the Prophet's family lapsed after Muhammad's death. The early Rashidun Caliphs, notably Caliph Omar, set down regulatory guidelines for what could and could not be regarded as war spoils, and assigned the fifth for welfare distribution. The 'fifth' eventually became an important source of financing for the Caliphal administration and army. Schools of Islamic law were divided on whether the fifth extended to treasure troves and mining. Some schools (notably, the Hanafite), regarded treasure and mines as 'spoils' and thus subject to the fifth, while others (notably the Shafi'ite and Hanbalite) regarded them as subject only to the conventional rates, e.g. zakat.

The medieval Taifa kingdoms of al-Andalus embraced the Hanafi argument and institutionalized the fifth on war spoils, treasure troves and mining.  The 'royal fifth' was adopted by the Christian states of the Iberian peninsula (Castile, Portugal, etc.) during the reconquista and extended to their overseas colonies in the Americas, Africa and Asia.  They became an important part of crown finance. 

During the age of exploration, Spanish and Portuguese captains and conquistadores were careful to always set aside the royal fifth from any spoils they captured, and accusations of embezzling the 'royal fifth' ended the careers of a few of them (e.g. Alonso de Ojeda, Pedro Alonso Niño). Nonetheless, to encourage exploration and colonization, Iberian monarchs often allowed explorers and colonial developers to retain part or all of the royal fifth, for at least some period of time. The conditions were usually spelled out in captaincy contracts or royal grants, e.g. in 1402, Jean de Béthencourt was allowed to keep the royal fifth as a condition for the conquest of the Canary Island for Castile;  in 1443, the Portuguese Prince Henry the Navigator was granted the royal fifth on all enterprise in the Madeira islands and sub-saharan Africa; in 1492, Christopher Columbus was allowed to retain 10% of the royal fifth of the West Indies (although he famously argued he was promised more); the 1532 contracts of the captains-donatary of colonial Brazil allowed them to retain 5% of the royal fifth.

In Spain, the quinto real on mining of all precious metals and minerals (in theory; in practice, it was collected only on gold, silver, mercury, gemstones and pearls) was codified by the edict of February 1504, and (with occasional exceptional grants) remained in force through all the Spanish empire until the 18th century. In 1723, it was reduced to a diezmo (10%) and in 1777 it was reduced further to 3%, with an additional duty of 2% if shipped to Spain.

References 

Spanish colonization of the Americas
Economic history of Mexico
Portuguese colonization of the Americas

es:Quinto (impuesto)
pt:Quinto do ouro